The butterfly chair, also known as a BKF chair or Hardoy chair, is a style of chair featuring a metal frame and a large sling hung from the frame's highest points, creating a suspended seat. The frame of the chair is generally painted black. The sling was originally leather, but can also be made from canvas or other materials. The design is popular for portable recreational seating.

History 
The chair was developed for an apartment building they designed in Buenos Aires.

On March 6, 1940, a picture of the chair appeared in the US publication Retailing Daily, where it was described as a "newly invented Argentine easy-chair . . . for siesta sitting". On July 24, 1940, the chair was awarded the 2nd prize by the National Cultural Commission  at the 3rd Salón de Artistas Decoradores exhibition in Argentina. Both the exhibition and the picture in Retailing Daily attracted the attention of the Museum of Modern Art in New York. At the request of the director of MoMA's Industrial Design Department, Edgar Kaufmann Jr., Hardoy sent 3 chairs to New York. One went to Fallingwater, Edgar Kaufmann Jr.'s home in Pennsylvania (designed by Frank Lloyd Wright), another went to MoMA, while the third probably went to Clifford Pascoe of Artek-Pascoe, Inc., New York.

The chair gets the name of BKF chair from the initials of its creators "Bonet-Kurchan-Ferrari". It is also known as the Hardoy chair because an official letter from the firm attributed primary authorship of the design to Ferrari-Hardoy.

Origins 
The BKF chair is a revival of the Paragon chair (more recently known as the Tripolina chair), which was designed by Joseph Beverley Fenby and has been used as campaign furniture and camping furniture since the 1880s.

Production 
The chair was originally designed in Argentina. However,  Edgar Kaufmann Jr. accurately predicted that it would become extremely popular in the US, calling it one of the "best efforts of modern chair design". In the early 1940s, it was produced in the US by Artek-Pascoe, Inc., New York). Production was slow, due to wartime shortage of metal.

After the war, the US production rights were acquired by Hans Knoll, who had recognized its commercial potential in 1947 and added it to the Knoll line. The chair’s commercial success led to a surge in unauthorized replicas. After a losing a legal case for design-infringement, Knoll ceased production in 1951.

Since then, versions of the butterfly chair continue to be produced by many manufacturers from many countries. 

In 2018, Knoll rereleased a 100th anniversary tribute to the Butterfly Chair.

References

Chairs
Individual models of furniture
Portable furniture
Argentine inventions